John Stuart Ogilvie (1843 - 1910) was a publisher in the United States. He was born in Scotland and immigrated to the U.S. with his family at age four. Ogilvie published John Cowan's Science of a New Life. Ogilvie published dime novels and how-to books. The American Bookseller ran an image of Ogilvie. His book Seven Hundred Album Verses had a significant influence.

Ogilvie published an illustrated program for New York City's commemoration ceremonies for the centennial of George Washington's first inauguration held in New York City in 1789.

Bibliography
The Album Writer's Friend: Comprising More Than Three Hundred Choice Selections of Poetry and Prose, Suitable for Writing in Autograph Albums, Valentines, Birthday, Christmas and New Year Cards (1881)
Ogilvie's Handy Book of Useful Information and Statistical Tables of Practical Value: A Universal Handbook for Ready Reference (1884)
Seven Hundred Album Verses; Choice selections of poetry and prose
Life and Death of Jay Gould, and how he made his millions
One Hundred Prize Dinners (1889)
How to Woo: When and Whom (1889)
Illustrated Programme of the Centennial Celebration in New York, April, 1889 The Victim of His Clothes by Charles Wotherle Hooke and Frederick Russell Burton, J. S. Ogilvie New York 1890The Press Prize Recipes for Meats, Vegetables, Bread and PastryThe Album Writer's FriendHistory of the Attempted Assassination of James A. GarfieldThe Life and Death of James A. Garfield; From the tow path to the White HouseHistory of the General SlocumThe "Man in the Street" stories from the New York TimesOgilvie's Book on How to Become an American CitizenHow to Talk and DebateHistory of the Great Flood in Johnstown, Pa., May 31, 1889, by Which over Ten Thousand Lives Were LostOgilvie's House Plans'' (1895)

References

American publishers (people)
1843 births
1910 deaths
19th-century American businesspeople